Elena Drobychevskaja, married Werner (born 1968 in Minsk) is a Belarusian artist and graphic artist.

Biography 
Drobychevskaja had private tuition from 1986 until 1990 with Professor Romanko (former dean of the Monumental Painting Department of the academy of arts) in Minsk. From 1989 until 1992 she studied as a graphic artist and animated film draftswomen at the department of cinematography in Moscow. From 1989 until 1995 she was employed by the film studio "Belarusfilm" in Minsk.

Film
In 1996/97 she worked at Bioskop-Film Munich as assistant animator on the animated cartoon project "Die furchtlosen Vier" (The fearless Four  – a modern remake of the Town Musicians of Bremen). The world premiere was in the Gloria Palace 1997 in Munich. Since 2003 she has been working as a freelance artist. Since 2009 member of artist association "Artist Circle Haar".

Art 

Drobychevskaja works in a variety of media, including pastel, acrylics and oils. She prefers horses as a subject, which are valued by classicists of Spanish horses. She also paints other subjects, for instance, female nudes.

Solo exhibitions 
 2018: "Change of the Dynamic" - Mohr-Villa, Munich
 2013: "Maritime" - Zollamt Gallery, Varel
 2011: "La rentrée au galop avec Elena Drobychevskaïa" – Gallery ArtFontainebleu, France
 2011: "Cafe – House – Pictures" – Harbour Gallery Varel
 2009: "Red Horse" – Municipal Gallery Bad Griesbach

Group exhibitions 

 2019: "Kunstschimmer 7", Ulm
 2017: "Marler Stern", Marl, Germany
 2016: "KunstARTerie" - Sonthofen
 2013: "Cooperation Galerie Inspire Art" – Gallery Inspire Art, Dresden
 2010: "Interlude equestre" – Gallery ArtFontainebleau, France

References

External links 
 officially Website: Elena Drobychevskaja, Munich
 

Modern painters
1968 births
Living people
Artists from Minsk
Belarusian painters
Belarusian women painters
Equine artists
Belarusian women artists
20th-century women artists
20th-century Belarusian artists
21st-century Belarusian artists
21st-century women artists